Dmitri Aleksandrovich Kryuchkov (1887 in Saint Petersburg, Russian Federation – 1936?) in Russian: Дмитрий Александрович Крючков was a Russian poet and a convert to Catholicism.

Early life

Born in 1887 in Saint Petersburg in a middle-class family, Kryuchkov studied in a German high school, but did not graduate.

Career 
Kryuchkov was engaged in the course of Ego-Futurism poetry and published two collections of poetry (in 1913 and 1914). Much of his poetry had themes of landscapes and religion. His first book of poetry was titled "Padun Nemolchnyi" (The Incessant Faller) published in 1913. His second book of poetry was titled "Tsvety Ledyanye" (Icy Flowers) and was published in 1914, featuring poems exclusively about winter landscapes. As Ego-Futurism eventually dissipated, Kryuchkov faded into obscurity along with other poets of this movement.

Kryuchkov served as a psalmist in the Orthodox Church of Saint Panteleimon. In autumn 1922, he met with Leonid Fyodorov, Exarch of the Russian Greek Catholic Church. On August 19, 1923 Kryuchkov joined to Catholic Church. He worked as a writer-translator for the state publishing house . 

On December 7, 1923, he was arrested and tried in the group case of Russian Catholics. On December 19, 1923, Kryuchkov was sent for further investigation in Moscow and imprisoned in Butyrskaya prison. On May 19, 1924, he was sentenced under Article 61 of the Criminal Code of the RSFSR to 10 years in prison. He was sent to Irkutsk politizolator (political prison), and eventually transferred to the Osinovskoye subcamp (lagotdelenie) of Siblag, where he worked in the mines of Aralichev and Osinovka. On December 22, 1932, he was released from the camp ahead of time with banned residence in 12 major cities and the Ural region.

Personal life 
Since January 1933, Kryuckkov lived in Yaroslavl, where he was again arrested in 1936 and sentenced to 15 years in labor camps. The subsequent fate is unknown.

References

External links
 http://www.catholic.ru/modules.php?name=Encyclopedia&op=content&tid=4360

Converts to Eastern Catholicism from Eastern Orthodoxy
Former Russian Orthodox Christians
Russian Catholic poets
Russian Eastern Catholics
Russian male poets
Year of death missing
Russian Futurism
1887 births